Melaleuca montis-zamia is a plant in the myrtle family, Myrtaceae and is endemic to the Springsure district in Queensland, Australia. (Some Australian state herbaria use the name Callistemon montis-zamiae.) It is a shrub with red bottlebrush flowers.

Description

The flowers are a shade of red with the stamens tipped with yellow. They are arranged in spikes on the ends of the branches which continue to grow after flowering and also on the sides of the branches. There are 40 to 58 stamens in each flower.

Taxonomy and naming
Melaleuca montis-zamiae was first formally described in 2009 by Lyndley Craven in Novon, but the spelling was in error, later corrected to M. montis-zamia. The specific epithet (montis-zamia) is from the Latin word mons meaning "a mountain" and Zamia, in reference to the habitat of this species at Mt. Zamia in the Minerva Hills National Park, Queensland.

Callistemon montis-zamiae is regarded as a synonym of Melaleuca montis-zamia by the Royal Botanic Gardens, Kew. Craven noted that the spelling Melaleuca montis-zamiae in the Novon article is an error which was not detected at the proof stage.

Distribution and habitat
Melaleuca montis-zamia occurs in the Springsure district. It grows in scrub near watercourses.

References

montis-zamia
Flora of Queensland
Plants described in 2009
Taxa named by Lyndley Craven